The Sfinks festival is a Belgian festival for world music at Boechout. The festival is held during the last weekend in July.

History
The festival was originally held (1975–1994) in a local school park. In 1982 the festival featured exotic music for the first time which changed its appearance forever. In 1992 and 1994, Friday and Thursday were added to the festival to accommodate the expanding program. In 1994, the venue was changed to a larger site, the 'Molenveld' in Boechout to accommodate the larger crowds. The festival currently receives about 40,000 visitors and over 40 bands each year. Since some years the festival has shrunk again to three days.

Line-up

1980 
Vermenton Plage, The McCalmans, Marie Jeanne Tellez, Arthus, Fiddle Feaver, Rum, Aristide Padygros, Fiddle Feaver, Stockton's Wing, Fran O'Rourke, Trol, Ossian, Bob Frank en Zussen, Brenda Wootton, Angélique Ionatos, Nino de San Andres y sus Flamenco Orkestra, Rocking Dopsie & The Cajun Twisters.

1981 
Cromlech, Samboa, Paula Lockheart, Le Quator, André Bialek, Queen Ida & Le Bon Temps, Mandanga, Canto Libre, Carlos Andreu, Akka, Bonga, Juan Jose Mosalini Y Su Gran Orchestra De Tango, Vizönto and Deka.

1982 
Super Combo Créole, Big Bamboo Calypso Band, Lazare Kenmenge, Sacy Perere, Bovick and Partners, Koko Taylor Blues Machine, Makam es Kolinda, Toto Guillaume, Francis Bebey, Manu Dibango, Azuquita y Su Melao

1983 
Bula Sangoma, Los Salseros, Francis Bebey Quartet, Xalam, Tito Puente, Dudu Pukwana, Lemba, Ronald Shannon Jackson, Abdullah Ibrahim and Touré Kunda, Rip, Rig and Panic

1984 
Andy Narell, Idir, Mongo Santamaría, Franco et le T.P.O.K., Machitún, El Kholoud, Baklava, Ekomé, Fawzy Al Aiedy, Sun Ra Arkestra, Orchestre Jazira, Malembe, Lamogoya, Original Bushtown Rumours

1985 
Somo Somo, Zazou & Bikaye, Joia, Ástor Piazzolla, Junior Walker, Mashenka, Thoko Mdlaloso, Paulinho Ramos, Djurdura, Thomas Mapfumo and the Blacks Unlimited, Revanche

1986 
Claudy & Co, Carte de Séjour, Don Cherry Quintet, Working Week, Tania Maria, The Skyblasters, Eko Kuango, Desmond Dekker, Mahmoud Ahmed ft Neway Debebe & The Roha Band, Carmel, Youssou N'Dour and Waka Wakah

1987 
Sahl'omon, Lee Perry & The Upsetters, The Real Sounds of Africa, Gil Scott-Heron, Gilberto Gil, Macoubary, Zeebra, Flaco Jiménez su Conjunto, Courtney Pine Quartet, Gonzalo Rubalcaba y su grupo projecto, Kaba Mane and Kalabash

1988 
Ramiro Naka & N'Kassa Cobra, Andy Sheppard Quintet, David Rudder & Charly's Roots, Nina Simone, Thione Seck & Le Raam Daan, Shalawambe, S. E. Rogie, Toumani Diabate-Ketama ft Danny Thompson, Nusrat Fateh Ali Khan, Abdel Aziz El Mubarak, Alpha Blondy & The Solar System, Yemaya and Ali Farka Touré

1989 
Gilberto Gil, Umbelina, Pardesi Music Machine, King Sunny Adé, Remmy Ongala & Orchestre Matimila, Cheb Khaled, Panache Culture, Trilok Gurtu, Les Musiciens du Nile, Kristi Rose & The Midnight Walkers, Papa Wemba, Zouk Machine and Chi-Kin-Chee & Akwaaba

1990 
Irshad Khan, Toto Bissainthe, Chaba Djena, Les Têtes Brulées, Les Négresses Vertes, Princesse Mansia M'Bila, Sido ft Tamba Kumba, Jemaa, Najma Akhtar, Ivo Papazov & His Bulgarian Wedding Orchestra and Mexe Com Tudo

1991 
Hossan Ramzy, Caramusa, Super Diamono de Dakar, Aster Aweke, Femi Anikulapo ft Kuti, Mav Cacharel, Xiomara Fortuna & ses Kaliumbe, Seckou & Ramata, the Rebirth Brass Band, Farafina, Sapho, Rubén Blades and Zekle

1992 
Taraf de Haïdouks, Staatskoor van de Bulgaarse radio en televisie, Anoosh, Donke, Marisa Monte, Wallias Band, Los Reyes, Fuzue, Stella Rambisai Chiwese and The Earthquake Band, Eduardo Muniz, La Kumpania Zelwer, Lili Boniche, Orchestre Anti Choc de Bozi, Boziana, Olodum, Linton Kwesi Johnson, Paulus Damenië & Band and Phantoms

1993 
Donnisulana, Karoline Zaidline, Amiina, Ritos, Sarband, Nusrat Fateh Ali Khan & Party, Abana Ba Nasery, Lokua Kanza, Jean Emilien, Ghorwane, Classic Swede Swede, Ara Ketu, Les Amazones de Guinée, Donn Pullen's Afro Brazilian Connection, Bauls, Hedningarna, Los Van Van, Barrister, Fabulous Trobadors, Joji Hirota, Julie Mourillon, Molequa de Rua, Mouth Music, Ali Hassan Kuban, Reconciliation, Dmitri Pokrovsky Ensemble, Zap Mama, Super Rail Band de Bamako and Ray Lema et les voix Bulgares de l'ensemble Pirin

1994 
N'Java, Simentera, Lo'Jo Triban, Transglobal Underground, Jah Wobble & The Invaders of the Heart, Ngaari Laaw, N'Java, Gary Thomas & Hossam Ramzy, Simentera, Gitans ft Thierry Robin, The Last Poets, Aziza Mustafa Zadeh, Baaba Maal, Tierra Caliente, Snowboy, N'Dai N'Dai, Cheb Mami, Les Quatre Étoiles, Psamim, Gulabo Sapera, Tammurriata Di Scafati, A Filetta, Tuareg Bali, Juan Jose Mosalini Y Su Gran Orchestra De Tango, Cheb Khaled, I Muvrini, Lo'Jo Triban, The Klezmatics, The Western Diamonds, Papa Jube & The Jubelation Band, The Academy Brass Band and Kočani Orkestar

1995 
Ang Grupong Pendong, Gary Thomas & Hossam Ramzy, Mandé Foli, Youssou N'Dour, Sangit, Tuu, Yat-Kha, Patrick Persée, Balanescu Quartet, Lotfi Bouchnak & Ensemble Al Kindi, Ali Farka Touré, Master Musicians of Jajouka, Mandé Foli, Totó la Momposina, Prophets of Da City, Granmoun Léle, Remmy Ongala & Orchestre Super Matimila, Fanfare Jaïpur, Lulendo, Aurora Moreno, Eric Marchand et Le Taraf de Caransebeş, Mynta, Les Grand-Mères de Djanet, Sabri Brothers, Remmy Ongala & Totó la Momposina, Manu Dibango's Wakafrika Project ft Ray Lema & Mory Kanté & Bonga, Habib Koité et Bamada, Chico Science & Nação Zumbi and Papa Wemba

1996 
Danyel Waro, La Vieja Trova, Mestre Ambrosio, Genetic Drugs ft Karma Club, Yawar, Cesária Évora, La Vieja Trova, Kayo Fujino, Langa, Luzmila Carpio y sus Llaqtamasikuna, Noche Flamenco, Kangaroo Moon, The Bollywood Band, Danyel Waro, Up, Bustle and Out, Chaba Fadela & Cheb Sahraoui, Kanda Bongo Man, Tenores di Bitti, Hukwe Zawose & Wagogo Woman Drummers and Dancers, Banyumas Bamboo, Zehava Ben, Mighty Sparrow, Crocodile Style & Yawar, Iwakichi & Noriko Yamashita, Ekova, Yungchen Lhamo, Te Ava Piti, Ferus Mustafov, Mestre Ambrosio, Jaojoby, Mama Ohandja, Detrimental, Malouma Mint Meideh, Flamenco de Jerez, Yulduz Usmonova and Marzieh

1997 
Los Activos, Lunar Drive, Sally Nyolo, Tambours Sacrés, Voces Del Al-Andalus, Daniel Abebe, Ailanis, Ensemble Mzetamze, Didg Trio ft. Gary Thomas & Alan Dargin & Phillip Peris, Musafir, Lunar Drive, Gil & The Perfects, Sierra Maestra, The Asian Equation, Angélique Kidjo, Diblo Dibala & Matchatcha, D'Gary, Sékouba Bambino Diabate, Enrique Morento Y Gruppo, Amampondo, Carlinhos Brown, Tchota Suari & Antoni Sanches, Alla, Matlubeh, Sam Mangwana, Los Activos, Ouza Diallo, Sally Nyolo, Anastasia, Cándido Fabré, Psarantonis, Te Vaka, Emil Zrihan & the Israeli Andalusian Orchestra, Natacha Atlas and Radio Tarifa

1998 
Nēnēs, Zarboutan, Combays, Daúde, Jorge Ben Jor, Maracuta Naçao Pernambuco, Zarboutan, Jimi Mbaye, La Familia Valera Miranda, Avaton, Kadda Cherif Hadria, Monique Séka, Bulgarka Junior ft Ivan Lantos & Missa Primi Toni, Moriba Koita, Shahram Nazeri & Ensemble Dastan, Isabel Bayón, Nēnēs, Tartit, La Charanga Habanera, Wimme, Extra Musica, Gnawa 'Lila', Combays, Ismael Rudas & Daniel Celedon, Sawt El Atlas, Africando, Musa Dieng Kala, Susana Baca, Ismael Rudas & Daniel Celedon, Liu Sola, Nahawa Doumbia, Xu Chao Minh, Musa Dieng Kala, Massa Konate, Liu Sola, Didges ft. Gary Thomas & Alan Dargin & Mark Atkins, Susana Baca, Likembe Geant and Eleftheria Arvanitaki

1999 
Leilía, Swédé Lokelé, Bagunçaço, Brotherhood of Brass, Trip do Brasil, Mahnimal, El Hadj N'Diaye, Teófilo Chantre, Alim Qasimov, Belén Maya & Mayte Martín, Sahraouis, Swédé Lokelé, Abdel Ali Slimani, Frédéric Galliano & Néba Solo, Super Cayor De Dakar, Bloque (band), Empire Bakuba, DJ Jungle Jazz, Manos Achalinotopoulos, Urna, La Banda Municipale de Santiago de Cuba, Sertab Erener, Alfredo de la Fé, Dhol Foundation, El Hadj N'Diaye, RDB, Black Star Liner, Dj Master Volume, Dj Ritu, DJ Aki, Joi, The Saint Nicholas Orchestra, The Farlanders, Aterciopelados, Brother Resistance & Rapso Riddum, Mamar Kassey, Jigme Drukpa, Abed Azrié (Suerte), Camerata Romeu, DJ Timmax, Melina Kana & Ashkabad, Leilía, Pact, Sheikh Yasîn Al-Tuhâmi, DJ Cheb i Sabbah, Amadou & Mariam, Sidestepper, DJ Armand, Ashkabad and Hypnotix

2013 
Concert tent: The Paradise Bangkok Molam International Band, Dakhabrakha, Akua Naru, Che Sudaka, Buscemi, Daniel Haaksman
Xamanek, Gaby Amarantos, Batucada Sound Machine, Ky-Mani-Marley, Civalizee Foundation, Dj Babybang, Salam Musik, Azalai Project, Guido Belcanto, Terakaft, Gaby Amartontos, Turntable Dubbers, mps PILOT, Coely, The Flexican ft. MC Sef, Captain Steel, Kapitein Winokio, Sana Bob, Lindigo, Ricardo Lemvo & El Bataillon De La Rumba, Clement Peerens Explosition (CPeX)

2014 
Vroink, Amigos, De Piepkes, Radio Oorwoud, Leki, Palenke Soultribe, Jupiter & Okwess International, Orquesta Aragon, Discobar Galaxie, Tinariwen, Flip Kowlier, Binti, Catrin Finch & Seckou Keita, Bassekou Kouyate & Ngoni Ba, Boddhi Satva, Karol Conka, Lady S., Lefto, Dj Marfox, Broukar,...

2015 
Los De Abajo, Uproot Andy, Fresku, Jan Leyers, Merdan Taplak, Mr. Fuzz, Mystique, Omulu, Cheikh Lo, Slongs Dievanongs, Discobaar A Moeder, The Flexican ft. Mc Sef, Cookachoo, Zwartwerk, Bunny Wailer, Mashrou Leila, Nomobs, Fs Green & Mc Fit, Dj , Dj Ike, Olcay Bayir, Noreum Machi, Lady S, Ferro Gaita, Bart Peeters, Nidia Minaj, Pablo Fierro, Bossa Negra, Bachar Mar-Khalifé,...

External links
 

Music festivals in Belgium
Summer events in Belgium
Annual events in Belgium
Boechout